Barrière is a French surname. Notable people with the surname include:

Jean-Baptiste Barrière (1707-1747), French cellist and composer 
Jean-François Barrière (1786-1868), French historian 
Jean de la Barrière (1554–1600), French religious figure and contemporary of King Henry III of France 
Paul Barrière, (1920-2008), French rugby league football administrator 
Pierre Barrière (died 1593), wealthy French factory owner and prominent businessman who attempted to assassinate King Henry IV of France and was subsequently executed
Théodore Barrière (1823–1877), French dramatist
Dr. Pedro de Barriere (d. 1827), Spanish Colonial Governor and General

See also
Barriere, British Columbia, Canada (Alternate spelling: Barrière)
Barrière River (disambiguation)

French-language surnames